Rasoul Momeni is the ambassador of Iran to Zimbabwe.

On December 12, 2007 Momeni said the "violation of civil and political rights by the government of the United States of suspects in the so called 'war on terror' cannot be equated with the human rights violations by a small government within a limited territory."

References

Living people
Year of birth missing (living people)
Ambassadors of Iran to Zimbabwe